Great Western Mine, also known as Hetty Pit, was a coal mine, at Hopkinstown, near Pontypridd, Glamorgan in South Wales.

History
The mine was opened, as "Gyfeillon Pit", in August 1851 by John Calvert, an engineer from Yorkshire, who had already sunk the Newbridge Colliery (later to become part of the Maritime Collieries, near Graig, Pontypridd). In 1848 his money allowed the construction of the Gyfeillon Colliery to begin.

The colliery changed hands to the Great Western Railway Company, reverting to Calvert, before he in turn sold it to the Great Western Colliery Company. The company would sink six shafts in total and the pits would collectively be known as the Great Western Collieries.

The colliery initially had three shafts: Hetty Pit (downcast, later upcast), Pit No. 2 and Pit No. 3 (downcast). Hetty Shaft was sunk in 1875 to 392 yards.

1893 Disaster
On Tuesday 11 April 1893 a fire in the colliery led to the deaths of 63 men and boys. The ages of the dead ranged from 14 to 61. A total of 200 were reported as trapped but 150 were rescued. By 14 April 53 bodies had been recovered.

Sparks from the wooden brake blocks of a haulage engine had set fire to nearby brattice sheets. The fire spread quickly, fanned by the strong ventilation and ignited timber supports, sending dense clouds of smoke and fumes into the mine workings. The death toll would have been much higher had it not been for the actions of the district fireman, Thomas Prosser. Prosser bravely ventured into the dense smoke and, by opening a set of air doors, diverted the noxious fumes out of the mine.

Later activity
The Inspector of Mines list for 1896 recorded a total of 475 men working at the Great Western No. 2 pit and 604 men at Tymawr. By 1918 there were 3,162 men employed at the Great Western.

By 1923, Hetty No. 2 employed 683 men, working the Nine Feet and Red seams. Hetty No. 3 worked the Fforest Fach seam with 324 men. There were 1,143 men working at Tymawr, producing from the Five Feet, Four Feet, Lower Four Feet and Nine Feet seams.

The Great Western Colliery continued producing coal for many years after disaster, but with further fatalities. The Hetty shaft was closed in 1926, but remained as an upcast shaft for the Tymawr Colliery. The No. 2 and No. 3 shafts, together with the old Tymawr shaft, were closed the same year and a new Tymawr Pit was opened up.

In 1928 the colliery came under the ownership of the Powell Dyffryn Coal Company and remained so until the mines were nationalised in 1947. In 1958 the "Lewis Merthyr Colliery", a mile or two northwest of the former Great Western Collieries amalgamated with the Great Western and joined underground. At this time coal production stopped at the former and materials stopped going down at Tymawr. In 1969 combined collieries were officially named the "Tymawr and Lewis Merthyr Colliery". The last coal was raised at the Tymawr colliery on 21 June 1983 and the colliery was demolished soon after.

The Hetty Pit is a scheduled monument, the head frame and winding engine house are Grade I listed buildings and the Fan House is Grade II* listed. It was originally intended to incorporate the site into the Rhondda Heritage Park, but its future is now unclear. The Hetty winding house and engine are now being renovated by volunteers under supervision of Mr Brian Davies of the Pontypridd Museum.

References

 

Buildings and structures in Rhondda Cynon Taf
Collieries in South Wales
Grade I listed buildings in Rhondda Cynon Taf
Grade II* listed buildings in Rhondda Cynon Taf
Scheduled monuments in Wales
Underground mines in Wales
Coal mining disasters in Wales
1893 mining disasters
1893 in Wales